Akuila Rokolisoa (born 27 June 1995) is a New Zealand rugby sevens player.

Biography 
Rokolisoa made his All Blacks Sevens debut at the 2018 Hong Kong Sevens.

Rokolisoa was named in the All Blacks Sevens squad for the 2022 Commonwealth Games in Birmingham. He won a bronze medal at the event. He featured for New Zealand at the 2022 Rugby World Cup Sevens in Cape Town. He won a silver medal after his side lost to Fiji in the gold medal final.

References

External links
Akuila Rokolisoa at All Blacks.com

1995 births
Living people
New Zealand international rugby sevens players
Commonwealth Games rugby sevens players of New Zealand
New Zealand male rugby sevens players
Commonwealth Games medallists in rugby sevens
New Zealand rugby union players
Rugby sevens players at the 2022 Commonwealth Games
Commonwealth Games bronze medallists for New Zealand
Medallists at the 2022 Commonwealth Games